1962 Egypt Cup Final, was the final match of the 1961–62 Egypt Cup, was between Zamalek and Al Ittihad Alexandria, Zamalek won the match 5–1.

Route to the final

Match details

References

External links
 http://www.angelfire.com/ak/EgyptianSports/ZamalekInEgyptCup.html#1962

1962
EC 1962
EC 1962